Voskoboinikov or Voskoboynikov is a Russian masculine surname, its feminine counterpart is Voskoboinikova or Voskoboynikova. It may refer to
Dmitri Voskoboynikov (1941–2001), Russian volleyball player
Oleg Voskoboynikov (born 1971), Kazakh football player 
Vladimir Voskoboinikov (born 1983), Estonian football player 

Russian-language surnames